James Amuta (born April 12 in Lagos, Nigeria) is a film producer, director, aerial cinematographer and publicist. He is best known for his documentary film "Nightfall in Lagos" which was nominated for the best documentary film in 2018 by the Africa Magic Viewers' Choice Award.

He also served as Producer on the critically acclaimed Netflix Original Film, Oloture and as co-producer on the box office blockbuster, Your Excellency. He is the writer/director of BiCuriosity which was shortlisted as a finalist by the Colorado Film Institute.

James Amuta wrote and also served as producer on Collission Course which was selected as the AFRIFF 2021 Closing Film, and also nominated for 4 awards at the 2021 Africa Movie Academy Award, winning 2 awards, including Prize for Achievement in Screenplay.

James Amuta co-produced Elesin Oba: The King's Horseman, a Netflix film adaptation of Wole Soyinka's Death and the Kings Horseman.

Amuta is also a poet and has a published book "Enigma: Beyond the Poet".

Filmography

Awards and nominations

References 

Year of birth missing (living people)
Living people
Nigerian film producers
Nigerian film directors
Nigerian documentary filmmakers
Nigerian cinematographers